Dr Albert George Long FRSE LLD (1915–1999) was a British educator and palaeobotanist. He was an expert on the Lower Carboniferous period. He was creator of the Cupule-Carpel Theory.

Life
He was born in Inskip, Lancashire on 28 January 1915 the son of Rev Albert James Long (died 1940), a Baptist minister, and his wife, Isabel Amblet (died 1960). He attended school in Todmorden. As a schoolboy he was shot in the left foot and relied on a medical boot to walk, walking with a permanent limp. He then studied Science at Manchester University under Prof William Henry Lang. He then underwent training as a teacher, and initially took a post at Lewes in Sussex.

In 1945 he began teaching Science at Berwickshire High School in Duns in the Scottish Borders.
In 1962 he was elected a Fellow of the Royal Society of Edinburgh. His proposers were Charles Waterston, John Walton, Alexander Mackie and Claude Wardlaw. Unusually he won the Society's Makdougall-Brisbane Prize for the period 1958 to 1960, prior to being made a Fellow. In 1966 he was awarded an honorary doctorate (DSc) from his alma mater and in 1967 a second honorary doctorate (LLD) from Glasgow University.

In 1966 he left Duns to become Deputy Curator of the Hancock Museum in Newcastle-upon-Tyne.

He died at home in Tweedmouth on 13 March 1999.

Publications
Hitherto (1996) (autobiography)

Family
He married Gladys Hunt in 1942. They had two children, Jean and David.

References

1915 births
1999 deaths
Scientists from Lancashire
Alumni of the University of Manchester
British palaeontologists
Fellows of the Royal Society of Edinburgh
People from the Borough of Fylde
Schoolteachers from Lancashire